No Parlez is the debut solo studio album by English singer Paul Young. Released in 1983, it reached number one on the UK Albums Chart (for a non-consecutive total of 5 weeks) and remained in the UK Top 100 for 119 weeks. The album has been certified quadruple platinum by the BPI for UK sales in excess of 1.2 million copies.

Initially, the first two singles, "Iron Out the Rough Spots" and a remake of "Love of the Common People", had no success, but the third, a cover of the Marvin Gaye classic "Wherever I Lay My Hat (That's My Home)", was No. 1 in the UK Singles Chart for three weeks in July and August 1983, and the first of Young's 14 British Top 40 singles. Similar success followed in continental Europe. In the UK, the follow-up single "Come Back and Stay" reached No. 4, and the re-release of "Love of the Common People" made it to No. 2 in late 1983.

The album was released the year after the introduction of CDs with their potential for a longer playing time. The CD edition of "No Parlez" featured one extra track (Behind Your Smile) not on the vinyl release. Additionally, five of the other 11 tracks were extended versions compared to the vinyl edition.

The album featured eight cover versions alongside two tracks written by Young and keyboard player Ian Kewley and one written by the guitarist in Young's band at the time, Steve Bolton. Three of the cover versions were written by Jack Lee who also wrote "Hanging on the Telephone" which was a big hit for Blondie.

The album was released with a different cover in North America, and a new video for the single "Come Back and Stay" was made.

In 2008, a promotional CD of the album was distributed by the Daily Mail newspaper.

Track listing

Original UK vinyl edition 
Side one
 "Come Back and Stay" (Jack Lee)  – 4:57
 "Love Will Tear Us Apart" (Ian Curtis, Peter Hook, Stephen Morris, Bernard Sumner) – 5:00
 "Wherever I Lay My Hat (That's My Home)" (Marvin Gaye, Barrett Strong, Norman Whitfield)  – 5:18
 "Ku Ku Kurama" (Steve Bolton)  – 4:19
 "No Parlez" (Anthony Moore) – 4:57

Side two
 "Love of the Common People" (John Hurley and Ronnie Wilkins)  – 4:56
 "Oh Women" (Jack Lee)  – 3:35
 "Iron Out the Rough Spots" (Steve Cropper, Booker T. Jones, David Porter)  – 4:47
 "Broken Man" (Ian Kewley, Paul Young) – 3:54
 "Tender Trap" (Ian Kewley, Paul Young) – 4:32
 "Sex" (Jack Lee) – 4:49

Original CD edition 

 "Come Back and Stay" (Jack Lee)  – 7:56 (scratch mix)
 "Love Will Tear Us Apart" (Ian Curtis, Peter Hook, Stephen Morris, Bernard Sumner) – 5:00
 "Wherever I Lay My Hat (That's My Home)" (Marvin Gaye, Barrett Strong, Norman Whitfield)  – 6:01 (extended club mix)
 "Ku Ku Kurama" (Steve Bolton)  – 4:19
 "No Parlez" (Anthony Moore) – 4:57
 "Behind Your Smile" (Ian Kewley, Paul Young) – 4:08
 "Love of the Common People" (John Hurley, Ronnie Wilkins)  – 5:51 (extended club mix)
 "Oh Women" (Jack Lee)  – 3:35
 "Iron Out the Rough Spots" (Steve Cropper, Booker T. Jones, David Porter)  – 7:28 (extended club mix)
 "Broken Man" (Ian Kewley, Paul Young) – 3:54
 "Tender Trap" (Ian Kewley, Paul Young) – 4:32
 "Sex" (Jack Lee) – 6:51 (extended club mix)

Production 
 Laurie Latham – producer, engineer 
 Tim Young – mastering 
 CBS Studios (London) – mastering location 
 Jason Bakx – sleeve artwork 
 Eric Watson – photography 
 Barry Watts – inner sleeve photography,
 Mark Irving – inner sleeve photography
 Martin Serene – inner sleeve photography
 Ged Doherty – inner sleeve photography, management

Personnel 
 Paul Young – lead vocals, backing vocals, guitars (1, 10), arrangements 
 Ian Kewley – acoustic piano, Oberheim OB-X, E-mu Emulator, vocoder, atmospheric sounds, strings, marimbas, bells, backing vocals, arrangements
 Matt Irving – ARP synthesizer, Roland MC-4 Microcomposer, guitars, bass guitar (2, 7), backing vocals 
 Steve Bolton – acoustic piano doodlings, guitars, lap steel guitar
 Pino Palladino – bass guitar (1, 3–6, 8, 10, 11, 12), Chapman Stick (1, 10)
 Mark Pinder – drums, Simmons drums, Roland TR-808, percussion, cowbells
 Rico Rodriguez – trombone (7, 11)
 Laurie Latham – arrangements
 Kim Lesley – backing vocals, congas (12)
 Maz Roberts – backing vocals 
 Eyethu [Nimsa Calliza, Dagmar Krause, Chief Dawethi, Eyethu, Zundi Lekau, Wally Loate, Jabu Mbato, Fats Mogoboya and Norman Zulu] – backing vocals (5)

Charts

Weekly charts

Year-end charts

Certifications

2008 re-release 
The album was re-released on 30 June 2008 in the UK and worldwide on 5 August 2008 as a 25th-anniversary edition. It contains the original 11 tracks as well as a bonus 10-track disc with a combination of B-sides, remixes and live tracks. Although the booklet claims that this is the original vinyl album on CD, three songs are shortened from their UK vinyl release; "Come Back and Stay", "Love Will Tear Us Apart" and "Love of the Common People", all of which use the respective single edits found on the original US and Canadian pressings of the album. The original UK vinyl versions of these tracks remain unreleased on CD.

The Extended Club mixes of "Wherever I Lay My Hat" and "Sex", the full version of "Love Will Tear Us Apart" and the Scratch Mix of "Come Back and Stay", which were all included on the original CD and cassette release, were not included on the 25th anniversary edition. However, In 2013 they were all included on the compilation album Remixes and Rarities.

Track listing 
 "Come Back and Stay" (Jack Lee) (single edit)  – 4:24
 "Love Will Tear Us Apart" (Ian Curtis, Peter Hook, Stephen Morris, Bernard Sumner) (single edit) – 4:17
 "Wherever I Lay My Hat (That's My Home)" (Marvin Gaye, Barrett Strong, Norman Whitfield)  – 5:18
 "Ku Ku Kurama" (Steve Bolton)  – 4:20
 "No Parlez" (Anthony Moore) – 4:54
 "Love of the Common People" (John Hurley, Ronnie Wilkins) (single edit) – 4:00
 "Oh Women" (Jack Lee)  – 3:34
 "Iron Out the Rough Spots" (Steve Cropper, Booker T. Jones, David Porter)  – 4:47
 "Broken Man" (Ian Kewley, Paul Young) – 3:55
 "Tender Trap" (Ian Kewley, Paul Young) – 4:31
 "Sex" (Jack Lee) – 4:49

Bonus Disc track listing 
 "Come Back and Stay" (Extended Club Mix) – 7:34 [different remix compared to the original CD release]
 "Iron Out the Rough Spots" (Extended Club Mix) – 7:28 [same version as on the original CD release]
 "Love of the Common People" (Extended Mix) – 5:51 [same version as on the original CD release]
 "Behind Your Smile" – 4:10 [same as on the original CD release]
 "I've Been Lonely for So Long" – 3:37
 "Yours" – 5:39 [extended club mix, B-side from "Come Back and Stay")
 "Sex" (Demo Version) – 3:49
 "Pale Shelter" (Demo Version) – 3:50
 "Better to Have and Don't Need" (Live Version) – 5:57 (B-side from "Love of the Common People" 12 inch)
 "Wherever I Lay My Hat (That's My Home)" [Live Version] – 5:59 (B-side from "Love of the Common People" 12 inch)

How the different editions compare 
Tracks are the same versions unless stated in the notes column.

It is possible to create the original vinyl version of the album by using a combination of the original UK and US CD releases together with the 'Full length' version of Come Back and Stay which is included on the 2015 Tomb of Memories career-spanning box set.

References 

1983 debut albums
Paul Young albums
Albums produced by Laurie Latham
Columbia Records albums